Nigmatullino (Niğmätulla) is a rural locality (a selo) and the administrative center of Nigmatullinsky Selsoviet, Alsheyevsky District, Bashkortostan, Russia. The population was 553 as of 2010. There are 8 streets.

Geography 
Nigmatullino is located 32 km southeast of Rayevsky (the district's administrative centre) by road. Sartbash is the nearest rural locality.

References 

Rural localities in Alsheyevsky District